Bartlow Hills is a Roman tumuli cemetery in Bartlow, Cambridgeshire, England. The site was in Essex until a boundary alteration in 1990. Four of the original seven tumuli or barrows remain; the largest three are accessible to the public, the northernmost and smallest is on private property and is not easily visible. The remnants of two more are visible as low mounds west of the three largest barrows. The barrows date from the 1st or 2nd centuries CE.

Excavations were undertaken in the 19th century (chiefly in 1832–40), discovering remains of large wooden chests, decorated vessels in bronze, glass and pottery and an iron folding chair (most of which were lost in a fire at Easton Lodge in 1847). A small Roman villa, occupied until the late 4th century, was situated north of the mounds and was excavated in 1852. The site saw no further work until a geophysical survey in 2006 and further excavations in 2007, but this work did not establish the location of the villa.

References

External links 

 2007 excavations at Bartlow Hills by the University of Reading
 Bartlow Hills page at sheshen-eceni.co.uk
 Bartlow Hills on megalithic.co.uk
 A picture showing Bartlow Hills during the construction of the railway in about 1864 is available on this page.
 A set of aerial photographs of Bartlow Hills by Bill Blake is available on Flickr.
 Ashdon on british-history.ac.uk with information on Barlow Hills

Bibliography 
 Eckardt, H., Brewer, P., Hay, S. and Poppy, S. (2009) Roman barrows and their landscape context: a GIS case study at Bartlow, Cambridgeshire. Britannia, 40 (1). pp. 65–98. ISSN 1753-5352 
 Eckardt, H., Clarke, A. S., Hay, S., Macaulay, S., Ryan, P., Thornley, D. M. and Timby, J. (2009) The Bartlow Hills in context: report on recent excavations. Proceedings of the Cambridge Antiquarian Society, XCVIII. pp. 47–64. 
 Astin, T., Eckardt, H. and Hay, S. (2007) Resistivity imaging survey of the Roman barrows at Bartlow, Cambridgeshire, UK. Archaeological Prospection, 14 (1). pp. 24–37. ISSN 1075-2196 
 The 19th century excavations were published in the journal Archaeologia in the years 1834, 1836, 1840, and 1842.

Archaeological sites in Cambridgeshire